Big Swing Face is the eighth album by American singer and pianist Bruce Hornsby. It was Hornsby's first studio album with his touring band, the Noisemakers, and his last album for RCA Records .

The album was Hornsby's most experimental effort to date; the only album on which Hornsby barely plays any piano, it relied heavily on post-electronica beats, drum loops, Pro Tools editing, and dense synthesizer arrangements. The album also boasts a "stream-of-consciousness wordplay" of lyrics that are in many ways more eccentric and humorous than previous work.

The jazz fusion jam on "Cartoons & Candy" and the gesture towards Hornsby's jam band influence with Steve Kimock's extended guitar solo on "The Chill" highlighted some of the album's only familiar territory, and Hornsby cites the opening track, "Sticks and Stones," as his partial homage to Radiohead's "Everything in its Right Place."

Big Swing Face received mixed reviews, ranging from "a new and improved Bruce Hornsby" to feeling as if "someone else is singing", to the album being called one of the "strangest records of 2002". The album received little promotion from RCA Records, and sold poorly. Hornsby left RCA shortly afterward.

Track listing
All songs by Bruce Hornsby, except where noted.

Musicians 
 Bruce Hornsby – vocals, keyboards
 J. T. Thomas – organ (10)
 David Bendeth – guitars, bass (3-7, 9, 11), drum fills (7, 10), organ (11)
 Doug Derryberry – guitar (3, 9, 11), backing vocals (5)
 Steve Kimock – guitar solos (3, 4, 5)
 J. V. Collier – bass (1, 2, 4, 8, 10, 11)
 Taso Kotsos – drum programming
 Michael Baker – drums (1-4, 8, 9, 10)
 Bonny Bonaparte – drums (3, 9, 10)
 Bobby Read – bass clarinet (7, 11)
 Wayne Pooley – additional talking (7)
 Jeff Juliano – additional talking (7)
 Joe Lee – backing vocals (9)
 Floyd Hill – backing vocals (10)

Production 
 Producer and A&R – David Bendeth
 Engineers – David Bendeth, Arnold Geher, Jeff Juliano, Wayne Pooley and John Seymour.
 Assistant Engineer – John Adler
 Recorded at Electric Lady Studios (New York City, NY) and Tossington Sound (Williamsburg, VA).
 Mixed by David Bendeth (Tracks #1, 6 & 11), John Seymour (Tracks #1 & 11), Jeff Juliano (Tracks #2-9) and Dagle (Track #10).
 Mastered by Ted Jensen at Sterling Sound  (New York City, NY).
 Art Direction – FJH
 Photography – Sean Smith
 Illustration – Michael Miller

References

2002 albums
Bruce Hornsby albums
RCA Records albums
Albums produced by David Bendeth